Integrin alpha-D is a protein that in humans is encoded by the ITGAD gene.

References

Further reading

External links
ITGAD Info with links in the Cell Migration Gateway 

Integrins